Kaftar Milan (also Romanized as Kaftar Mīlān; also known as Kaftar) is a village in Qaleh Zari Rural District, Jolgeh-e Mazhan District, Khusf County, South Khorasan Province, Iran. At the 2006 census, its population was 76, in 22 families.

References 

Populated places in Khusf County